Syllepte achromalis is a moth in the family Crambidae. It was described by George Hampson in 1912. It is found in Cameroon, Nigeria and Sierra Leone.

Adults are pale brownish ochreous, with uniform glossy ochreous wings. The forewings with a faint dark point in the middle of the cell and a discoidal lunule.

References

Moths described in 1912
achromalis
Taxa named by George Hampson
Moths of Africa